Haploclastus is a genus of Indian tarantulas that was first described by Eugène Louis Simon in 1892. It is considered a senior synonym of Phlogiodes.

Diagnosis 
They can be distinguished by the deep and procured fovea, with horizontal thorn like hairs in two or three rows above and below the maxillary. These hairs have a long tapering, which where modified and aligned vertically in a "diffuse" pattern on the maxilla.

Species
 it contains seven species, found in India:
Haploclastus cervinus Simon, 1892 (type) – India
Haploclastus devamatha Prasanth & Sunil Jose, 2014 – India
Haploclastus kayi Gravely, 1915 – India
Haploclastus nilgirinus Pocock, 1899 – India
Haploclastus satyanus (Barman, 1978) – India
Haploclastus tenebrosus Gravely, 1935 – India
Haploclastus validus (Pocock, 1899) – India

In synonymy 
H. psychedelicus (Sanap & Mirza, 2014) = Haploclastus devamatha 
H. robustus (Pocock, 1899) = Haploclastus validus

Transferred to other genera 

 Haploclastus himalayensis (Tikader, 1977) → Chilobrachys himalayensis

See also
 List of Theraphosidae species

References

Theraphosidae genera
Spiders of the Indian subcontinent
Theraphosidae